So Tough is a song written by Gary Mears, and recorded by both the Original Casuals and The Kuf-Linx in 1958. Both versions charted. On March 17, 1958, Billboard listed "So Tough" as tied for Number 76 on "Top 100 Sides for Survey Week Ending March 8". On February 19, 1958 the Casuals performed the song on American Bandstand. The song topped out at #42 on the Hot 100 chart, and #6 on the Most Played R&B By Jockeys chart.

References

1958 songs